Our Lady of Lebanon of Paris Cathedral (Cathédrale Notre-Dame-du-Liban de Paris) is the cathedral and mother church of the Maronite Catholic Eparchy of Our Lady of Lebanon of Paris, part of the Maronite Church, for worship of Eastern Catholic tradition. It is located by the Jesuit Fathers of Sainte-Geneviève school in the 5th arrondissent in Paris, France, constructed 1893–94 by architect Jules-Godefroy Astruc.

History
Constructed circa 1893–94 by architect Jules-Godefroy Astruc, it was inaugurated on 13 May 1894, allocated by the Jesuit Fathers of Sainte-Geneviève school in Paris, consecrated to Our Lady of Lebanon, a Marian shrine in Beirut, Lebanon. Following the 1905 French law on the Separation of the Churches and the State, the Jesuits left it. It was then assigned in 1915 to the Maronite worship. In 1937, the Franco-Lebanese home was built around the parish. Renovations of the roof, canopy and rose were made in 1990-1993

Architecture

The Church of Our Lady of Lebanon also had a cultural role over 30 years, with the classical label Erato who performed most of their recordings in the church. More than 1,200 discs were recorded, including the flautist Jean-Pierre Rampal, trumpeter Maurice André and chamber orchestra Jean-François Paillard.

Interiors 

In 1984, at the suggestion of :fr:Robert Calle, director of the Curie Institute, adjoining the place was invested for six months by Spanish artist Miquel Barceló who installed a temporary workshop and painted his series of paintings in the Louvre exposed in the following year in the CAPC musée d'art contemporain de Bordeaux.

See also

Maronite Catholic Eparchy of Our Lady of Lebanon of Paris

References

External links

 Official website (French)
 http://www.maronites.fr/spip.php?article14

Lebanese diaspora in France
Roman Catholic churches in the 5th arrondissement of Paris
Maronite cathedrals
Eastern Catholic cathedrals in France
Cathedrals in Paris
Eastern Catholic churches in Paris
Roman Catholic churches completed in 1894
19th-century Maronite Church church buildings
19th-century churches in France